Mundal Lagoon (Muntal) is a lagoon in Puttalam District, western Sri Lanka. The lagoon is sometimes referred to as Mundal Lake.

The lagoon is linked to Puttalam Lagoon to the north by a channel. The lagoon's water is brackish.

The lagoon is surrounded by a region containing rice paddies, coconut plantations and scrubland. The land is used for prawn fishing and rice cultivation.

The lagoon has mangrove swamps, salt marshes and sea grasses. The lagoon attracts a wide variety of water birds including herons, egrets, terns and other shorebirds.

References

Salt and Water Balance in the Mundel Lake, H.B. JAY ASIRI / J.K. RAJAP AKSHA (Jan 01, 2022)

Bodies of water of Puttalam District
Lagoons of Sri Lanka